Ahmed Nazmin Sultana is a Bangladesh Awami League politician and the former Member of Parliament from a reserved seat.

Early life
Sultana was born on 5 January 1961.

Career
Sultana was elected to parliament from reserved seat as a Bangladesh Awami League candidate in 2008. She was a member of the Parliamentary Standing Committee on Ministry of Agriculture.

References

Awami League politicians
Living people
1961 births
Women members of the Jatiya Sangsad
9th Jatiya Sangsad members
21st-century Bangladeshi women politicians
21st-century Bangladeshi politicians